Adil Auassar (born 6 October 1986) is a Dutch professional footballer of Moroccan descent who currently plays for Sparta Rotterdam in the Dutch Eredivisie.

Early life
Auassar was born in Dordrecht, South Holland, the Netherlands. He grew up in Zwijndrecht, South Holland, and got two older brothers and one younger sister.

Club career

Youth career
Auassar started his youth career at local Zwijndrecht club Groote Lindt. At the age of 14, Auassar switched to Sparta Rotterdam's amateur side. He played for Sparta Rotterdam for three seasons, after which FC Dordrecht offered the young player a professional contract.

FC Dordrecht (2005–2007)
Auassar made his professional debut after the winter break of the season 2005–06. On 13 January 2006, he replaced Bart van Muyen in the 90th minute of the Eerste Divisie away match against FC Volendam (1–1). Auassar quickly became a first team regular and played a total of 11 matches in his first season. Auassar scored his first professional goal in his second season. On 1 September 2006, Auassar scored one goal in the away win against Fortuna Sittard (0–4). Auassar played a total of 30 matches in his second season, scoring three goals. He played an important role in FC Dordrecht's promotion playoffs qualification, but the club was knocked out by RKC Waalwijk after a third decider match. Auassar's good performance didn't pass by unnoticed. Eerste Divisie champions VVV-Venlo picked up the midfielder in the beginning of the season 2007–08 to play on the highest level.

VVV-Venlo (2007–2010)
Auassar made his Eredivisie debut on 15 September 2007, in the lost away match against De Graafschap (3–2). VVV-Venlo relegated in its first season, but promoted again in the follow-up season.

Feyenoord (2010–2012)
On 5 March 2010, Feyenoord announced the arrival of Auassar on a free transfer.
In 2011, he was loaned to the Dutch Eredivisie club RKC Waalwijk.

After a spell at De Graafschap, he moved to Excelsior. In summer 2016, Auassar signed a 3-year contract with Roda JC. In July 2018, he moved to Sparta Rotterdam on a 2-year deal.

References

External links
 

1986 births
Living people
Footballers from Dordrecht
Dutch sportspeople of Moroccan descent
Association football midfielders
Dutch footballers
Eredivisie players
Eerste Divisie players
FC Dordrecht players
VVV-Venlo players
Feyenoord players
RKC Waalwijk players
De Graafschap players
Excelsior Rotterdam players
Roda JC Kerkrade players
Sparta Rotterdam players